Rahim Bux Soomro (September, 1918 – January 24, 2005) was a politician in Sindh, Pakistan. He was born in September 1918 to Allah Bux Soomro, who later became a minister of Sindh multiple times.

External links
Rahim Bux Soomro obituary

R
1918 births
2005 deaths
Provincial ministers of Sindh